Palmerston Island is a coral atoll in the Cook Islands in the Pacific Ocean about  northwest of Rarotonga. James Cook landed there on 16 June 1774.

Overview
Palmerston Island is one of a number of sandy islets on a continuous ring of coral reef enclosing a lagoon. The only inhabited islet is Home. There are several small passages through the reef for boats, though there is no safe entry for large ships. At a latitude of 18 degrees south, Palmerston enjoys a tropical climate but is exposed to severe tropical cyclones. A particularly destructive series of storms occurred during the 1920s and 1930s. The atoll rim consists of a series of motu or islets. Clockwise from Home, these include:
 Home
 North Island
 Tara i tokerau
 Marions bank
 Motu Ngangie
 Lee To Us
 Leicester
 Small Cooks
 Karakerake
 Primrose
 Toms
 Cooks

All the islets are wooded with coconut palms, pandanus, and native trees. There is some natural ground water on Palmerston but water captured from rainfall is preferred for drinking. Shellfish inhabit the reef, and fish are abundant although there are concerns about overfishing. 25 people live in Palmerston, all but three descended from English sailor William Marsters.

The economy is based on fishing and though Palmerston's extreme remoteness makes a cash market difficult to maintain; in fact it is more like the subsistence ways of life in the northern atolls. Electricity and other modern utilities are available. Communication to the outside world is provided by Vodafone Cook Islands, including landline, internet and cellular phone service. The island has no airport or air service, but cargo ships visit a few times a year.

History
Palmerston was recorded by Captain Cook in 1774, but he did not land on the island until 13 April 1777. He found it uninhabited, though some ancient graves were discovered. Cook named the island after Henry Temple, 2nd Viscount Palmerston, then one of the Lords Commissioner of the Admiralty. The ancient name of the island was supposedly Avarau, meaning "two hundred harbour entrances". In 1863 William Marsters, a ship's carpenter and barrel maker, arrived on Palmerston from Manuae with two Polynesian wives. He added a third wife and sired a large family of some 23 children, whose descendants now inhabit Palmerston. Thus, Palmerston Island is the only island in the Cook Islands for which English is the native language.

Palmerston was annexed by the British Empire on 23 May 1891 and in 1892, the British Government granted William a 21-year lease which was extended until 1954. Palmerston came under New Zealand administration in 1901.

William Marsters, originally thought to have come from Leicestershire, England, is now believed to have come from Gloucestershire, which might explain why his descendants now spell the name "Marsters" due to the Gloucestershire accent. By the time his youngest daughter Titana Tangi died in 1973, there were over a thousand of Marsters' descendants living in Rarotonga and New Zealand.

Though only some 24 family members remain on Palmerston, all of Marsters' descendants consider the island their ancestral home. In 1954 the family was granted full ownership of the island. Three branches of the family remain on Palmerston, each branch being descended from one of William's three wives, marriage within a family group being prohibited. All of William's wives came from Tongareva and there are still many family links and common ancestors between these atolls.

Governance
Palmerston is administered by the Cook Islands government, through the Palmerston Island Administration (PIA), in association with New Zealand.

The Island's Council consists of six members, the three heads of each family and three other members appointed by each family. The Mayor is Bill Marsters.

See also
 Scratch My Arse Rock, a fishing spot supposedly named by Marsters

References

External links

 The English legacy of Palmerston Island
 Cook Islands website page on Palmerston Island Revised 20 January 2007
 Jane's Cook Islands website page on Palmerston Island Revised 30 November 2007
 5 Most Isolated Communities at The End of The Earth
 Palmerston Island Photos from a 1973 visit
 Map of Palmerston Island Maps of all the Cook Islands with Palmerston

 
Atolls of the Cook Islands